Lithuania competed at the 2022 Winter Olympics in Beijing, China, from 4 to 20 February 2022.

The Lithuanian team consisted of 13 athletes (eight men and five women) competing in four sports, the largest ever team Lithuania has sent to a Winter Olympics. Ice dancers Deividas Kizala and Paulina Ramanauskaitė were the country's flagbearer during the opening ceremony. Meanwhile cross-country skier Modestas Vaiciulis was the flagbearer during the closing ceremony.

Competitors
The following is the list of number of competitors participating at the Games per sport/discipline.

Calls for Olympic boycott 
On the 19th of November 2021, members of the Lithuanian national parliament Seimas released an official letter encouraging Lithuania to withdrawal from the 2022 Olympics due to human rights violations in China. This came to light during the China–Lithuania relations crisis, after the Republic of China (Taipei or Taiwan) opened its representative office in Vilnius under the name of "Taiwan" (the first under this name in Europe) in August 2021. In response, the People's Republic of China recalled its ambassador in Vilnius, Shen Zhifei, and demanded that Lithuania recall its ambassador in Beijing, Diana Mickevičienė. 

Trade between the two countries was seriously disrupted. Relations between the PRC and Lithuania were downgraded to the level of chargé d'affaires on 21 November 2021.

Daina Gudzinevičiūtė, president of the Lithuanian National Olympic Committee, released a statement that the Olympic Games should be politically neutral and confirmed that committee had no plans to boycott the games.

On the 3rd of December 2021, Lithuania was the first nation to announce a diplomatic boycott of the games.

Alpine skiing

By meeting the basic qualification standards Lithuania qualified one male and one female alpine skier.

Biathlon 

Based on their Nations Cup ranking in the 2021–22 Biathlon World Cup, Lithuania qualified 4 men.

Cross-country skiing

Lithuania has qualified the basic quotas in men's and women's events.

Distance

Sprint

Figure skating

In the 2021 World Figure Skating Championships in Stockholm, Sweden, Lithuania secured one quota in the ice dance competition. Allison Reed and Saulius Ambrulevičius were originally announced to represent Lithuania in the Winter Olympics; however, American-born Reed's application for Lithuanian citizenship was denied, and the pair was subsequently replaced by Paulina Ramanauskaitė and Deividas Kizala.

References

Nations at the 2022 Winter Olympics
2022
Winter Olympics